Magician: The Astonishing Life and Work of Orson Welles is a 2014 American documentary film by Chuck Workman.

Synopsis
Produced on the eve of the centenary of Orson Welles's birth, the film is a chronological review of his personal life and achievements in theatre, radio and film. It includes excerpts of nearly all of Welles's films, archival footage and audio, and interviews with colleagues, biographers, critics, friends and contemporary directors who credit his influence.

Release
First presented at numerous film festivals, the film was released theatrically on December 10, 2014.

Reception
The film received positive reviews with 73% on Rotten Tomatoes and 67 on Metacritic

The Observer called the film "an excellent primer on the maestro’s career".

References

External links 
 Official site
 
 
 
 

2014 films
2014 documentary films
American documentary films
Documentary films about Orson Welles
Films directed by Chuck Workman
Films about magic and magicians
2010s English-language films
2010s American films